Akim Badalov Badal oglu is an Azerbaijani politician who serves as the Director of State Agency on Alternative and Renewable Energy Sources of Azerbaijan Republic.

He was appointed the Director of State Agency on Alternative and Renewable Energy Sources of Azerbaijan Republic on January 18, 2010 by the Decree No. 689 of the President of Azerbaijan Ilham Aliyev. The agency was established on July 16, 2009.

See also
Cabinet of Azerbaijan

References 

Living people
Government ministers of Azerbaijan
Year of birth missing (living people)